Cabanatuan, officially the City of Cabanatuan, is a 1st class component city in the province of Nueva Ecija, Philippines. According to the 2020 census, it has a population of 327,325 people, making it the most populous city in Nueva Ecija and the fifth-most populous in Central Luzon.

The city is popular for being home to more than 30,000 motorized tricycles, making it the "Tricycle Capital of the Philippines." Its strategic location along the Cagayan Valley Road has made the city a major economic, educational, medical, entertainment, shopping, and transportation center in Nueva Ecija and nearby provinces in the region such as Tarlac, Aurora, and Bulacan. It has also earned the moniker "Gateway to the North."

Cabanatuan remained Nueva Ecija's capital until 1965 when the government created nearby Palayan City as the new provincial capital. Nueva Ecija's old capitol and other government offices are still used and maintained by the provincial administration.

After the campaign for the city's designation as a Highly Urbanized City failed, a motion was made to convert the city into a lone district instead.

History

Cabanatuan was founded as a Barrio of Gapan in 1750 and became a Municipality and capital of La Provincia de Nueva Ecija in 1780. Cabanatuan is the site of the historical "Plaza Lucero" and the Cabanatuan Cathedral, where General Antonio Luna was assassinated by Captain Pedro Janolino and members of the Kawit battalion. Cabanatuan lost the title of provincial capital in 1850 when the capital of Nueva Ecija was moved to San Isidro, another historic town. It was only in 1917, when the Administrative code was enacted, that Cabanatuan was restored as capital of the Province. However, in 1965, Congress created Palayan City, which has been the capital ever since.

During World War II, the occupying Japanese built Cabanatuan Prison Camp, where many American soldiers were imprisoned, some of whom had been forced to endure the infamous Bataan Death March. In January 1945, elements of the U.S. Army 6th Ranger Battalion and two teams of Alamo Scouts marched  behind enemy lines to rescue the prisoners in what became known as the Raid at Cabanatuan. As a result of the raid on January 30, 1945, victorious Filipino guerrillas, American troops of the U.S. Army 6th Ranger Battalion and Alamo Scouts celebrated having obtained the freedom of 500 American POWs. Soon thereafter, Philippine and American forces re-established the presence of military general headquarters and military camp bases of the Philippine Commonwealth Army, Philippine Constabulary 2nd Constabulary Regiment, and the United States Army in Cabanatuan from February 1, 1945, to June 30, 1946, during the Allied Liberation. Before long, the combined Philippine Commonwealth and American armed forces, in cooperation with local guerrilla resistance fighters and Hukbalahap Communist guerrillas, had liberated Central Luzon from Japanese Imperial forces, a campaign that lasted from January until August 1945.

In 1957, the barrios of Mataas na Kahoy, Balangkare Norte, Balangkare Sur, Sapang Kawayan, Magasawang Sampaloc, Talabutab Norte, Talabutab Sur, Platero, Belen, Pecaleon, Piñahan, Kabulihan, Pasong-Hari, Balaring, Pulong Singkamas, Panaksak, Bravo, Sapang Bato, Burol, Miller, Tila Patio, Pula, Carinay, and Acacia were separated from Cabanatuan and constituted into a separate and independent municipality known as General Mamerto Natividad.

Cityhood

Cabanatuan became a city by virtue of Republic Act No. 526, approved on June 16, 1950.

Highly Urbanized City (HUC)
In 1998, Cabanatuan was declared by then-president Fidel V. Ramos as a highly urbanized city however it failed ratification after the majority of votes in the plebiscite was negative.

Cabanatuan was declared as highly urbanized city by President Benigno S. Aquino III under Presidential Proclamation No. 418 on July 14, 2012. A plebiscite scheduled in December 2012 was moved by the Commission on Elections to January 25, 2014, so as not to burden the poll body during its preparation for the 2013 local elections in the province. Incumbent Governor Aurelio Matias Umali, who had a strong voter base in the city, opposed the conversion and submitted a petition to the Supreme Court. The Supreme Court issued a temporary restraining order on January 24, 2014. On April 23, 2014, voting 9-5-1, the Supreme Court granted a petition for certiorari filed by Nueva Ecija Gov. Aurelio Umali and declared as null and void Comelec Minute Resolution No. 12-0797 dated September 11, 2012, and Minute Resolution No. 12-0925 dated October 16, 2012, setting a date for the conduct of a plebiscite in which only registered voters of Cabanatuan would be allowed to vote. The province-wide plebiscite was rescheduled for November 8, 2014, but cancelled again because the Cabanatuan City government could not provide the necessary funds. No new date is to be set until the city government certifies that 101 million is available for the holding of the plebiscite.

1990 Luzon Earthquake 
Cabanatuan was near the epicenter of the infamous 1990 Luzon earthquake, which registered a 7.8 on the surface wave magnitude scale, at roughly 3 pm on July 16, 1990. It leveled some buildings, most notably the Christian College of the Philippines (Liwag Colleges) in the midst of class time, and killed 1,653 people. Around 154 people were said to be killed inside the CCP building.

Unlike in Baguio, local and international journalists were able to arrive at Cabanatuan City hours after the tremor, and media coverage of the quake in its immediate aftermath centered on the collapsed school, where rescue efforts were hampered by the lack of heavy equipment to cut through the steel reinforcement of fallen concrete.

Geography 
Cabanatuan City is located in the rolling central plains of Luzon drained by the Pampanga River. It is bordered by Santa Rosa to the south, Talavera and Gen. Mamerto Natividad to the north, Palayan to the north east, Laur to the east, and Aliaga to the west.

Climate and Natural Disasters 
Cabanatuan has a tropical wet and dry climate  (Köppen climate classification: Aw), with year-round warm weather and distinct dry and wet seasons. It is touted as one of the hottest cities in the country; in the summer season of 2011 Cabanatuan reached its hottest temperature at 39.8 °C, also the hottest in the Philippines in that same year, and on June 4, 2015 PAGASA reported a  heat index for the city, which is the hottest yet recorded.

According to the fifth Annual Natural Hazards Risk Atlas (NHRA) report in 2015, Cabanatuan City was ranked as the sixth city in the Philippines with extreme exposure to a myriad of natural hazards, especially typhoons and flooding.

Notable disasters have struck Cabanatuan City in the past decades, including the 1990 Luzon earthquake, 2013 Typhoon Santi, and 2015 Typhoon Lando. The 2013 Typhoon Santi brought extreme winds measuring up to 120 km/h, causing widespread infrastructure damages and power loss to the city.

Later in 2015, Typhoon Lando caused massive damage in the form of severe flooding in Central Luzon, including Cabanatuan City. The city experienced severe flooding, which hampered the operations of many establishments. Most roads going to the major districts of Cabanatuan were not passable to light vehicles for two to three days after the storm.

Recently in 2022, Typhoon Karding damaged numerous establishments, farmlands, and electric lines in the city.

Barangays
Cabanatuan is administratively subdivided into 89 barangays.

Demographics

Religion 
Roman Catholicism has been the predominant religion in the city, being host to a major cathedral – the St. Nicholas of Tolentino Cathedral which serves as the seat of the bishop of the Diocese of Cabanatuan. There are three other major Catholic structures located within the city: the Mother of Perpetual Help Parish, the Carmelite Sisters Convent and the Maria Assumpta Seminary. Local chapels/parishes are also present in most barangays.

The New St. Nicholas of Tolentine Cathedral (popularly known as Crypta) has been under construction in Lakewood, Cabanatuan City since 1999. The cathedral is a type of round church, similar to churches that were prominent in Nordic countries during the 11th and early 12th century. It will feature a park and shall be able to accommodate at least 3,000 people once it is finished.

Iglesia ni Cristo also maintains a sizable presence in Cabanatuan with its large house of worship in Barangay Zulueta that seats up to 5,000 people.

The United Methodist Church also has many local churches with a large congregation within the city. The United Methodist Church owns Wesleyan University Philippines and the Wesleyan University of the Philippines-Cardiovascular and Medical Center.

Other Philippine-based Christian denominations are also present in the city, such as Jesus Is Lord Church Worldwide, Jesus Miracle Crusade and Members Church of God International.

The Islamic faith also has a presence in Cabanatuan, specifically within the districts of Imelda and Isla. Two large mosques exist in the city, with the largest located at Imelda District.

Economy 

Cabanatuan is the economic heart of Nueva Ecija. More than 640,000 people live in its metropolitan area comprising the city and its adjacent municipalities. As a hub, many people in Nueva Ecija commute to the city during the day. This causes the city's daytime population to swell to about a million. Although Cabanatuan does not have significant manufacturing industries, its dynamic service and agricultural sectors drive the economy forward.

The city is a vital financial center housing a good number of banks, non-bank financial institutions, and headquarters of some of the largest rural banks in Central Luzon. The Bangko Sentral ng Pilipinas (BSP) maintains a branch in the city that performs cash operations and cash administration. , approximately 43 billion pesos in deposit liabilities is kept in the city's 65 banks. This amount constitutes more than half of the province's deposits. In terms of banking convenience, the city ranks as one of the most livable in the country together with Makati.

Water, Electricity, and Telecommunications 
Most of the water supply of the city is provided for by the Cabanatuan City Water District (CCWD), founded in 1974 through a resolution enacted by the Honorable City Council of Cabanatuan City, pursuant to PD 198. In recent years, the CCWD has entered into a JVA (Joint Venture Agreement) with PrimeWater Infrastructure Corporation, a private water service provider delivering quality services in the design of water distribution systems. It continues to provide most of the city's water supply.

Unlike the majority of Nueva Ecija, most of the electric services in the city are provided by the Cabanatuan Electric Corporation (CELCOR). Power generation companies like FCVC and FCRV operate a 12-8 MW diesel power plant and a 10-MW solar power plant, respectively. Major telecommunication companies like Globe Telecom, PLDT-Smart Communications, and Dito Telecommunity have also their respective infrastructures and business offices in the city. Local TV and Radio Stations, such as the city's main local channel CabTV 16 and radio broadcast channel, Big Sound FM 101.5, are also present.

Automotive Industry 
The motor vehicle industry is a notable part of the city economy. Popular global automotive companies has established dealerships in the city's metropolitan area. Existing car/truck dealerships include Mitsubishi, Kia, Isuzu, Mazda, Ford, Nissan, Peugeot, Hyundai, Hyundai Trucks and Buses, Suzuki, and Mahindra, all in Cabanatuan; Toyota, Foton and Honda in Santa Rosa town; Chevrolet and Hino in San Leonardo town. Motorcycle dealerships are common like in most Philippine mid-sized cities.

Logistics and Distribution 
The city is also a distribution and logistics center for goods and commodities; a number of distribution warehouses and sales offices of various companies serve the whole of Nueva Ecija and parts of neighboring provinces. The NFA warehouses in the city play an important role in regulating Nueva Ecija's burgeoning rice industry. The city acts as a trading place or bagsakan of agricultural produce from the surrounding farming communities.

Indicators reflect Cabanatuan's economic achievements in the past few years. Annual business registrations in the city grew 31.7% last 2015 while locally sourced taxes grew 14.81% annually in the five years to 2015. Residential buildings and subdivisions, numbering more than a hundred, are taking up lands on the fringes of the downtown.

Real Estate and Investment 

The presence of big land developers such as Santa Lucia Realty, Vista Land, and Ayala Land ensures competition and quality in the new suburban homes. New commercial buildings are springing up in the CBD and along Maharlika Highway at an average of seventy-five per year.

Cabanatuan nowadays is gradually becoming a major investment hub and is considered one of the most competitive cities for doing business in the country. Investors in banking, real estate, retail and other business and industrial enterprises are similarly drawn to the city because of its adequate infrastructure and investor support services. 

Its continuing urbanization is also luring investors into its suburban municipalities as well.

To further explore its economic potentials, Cabanatuan is seeking to have a share of the IT-BPO boom. The first call center in Nueva Ecija was successfully established in the city in 2008. The city government is providing prospective investors with fast business applications processing, low business taxes, and other incentives to attract big-ticket projects.

In 2015, the city's total assets amounted to PHP 3.719 billion and the total income reached PHP 1.696 billion.

Shopping Centers
Cabanatuan City serves as a major shopping hub in the province and other nearby localities.

Major Philippine mall chains such as Robinsons Malls, SM Supermalls, Walter Mart, and Puregold Price Club, Inc. have established their presence in the city. Currently, major shopping centers in the city include: NE Pacific Mall; SM Megacenter; Robinsons Townville Cabanatuan; SM City Cabanatuan which is built as a regional SM supermall with amenities such as a roof park, an indoor park, and a large-screen cinema; AllHome, and Waltermart. Cabanatuan has also multiple grocery and department stores including a chain of Savemore Supermarkets, Puregold Supermarkets, NE Supermarkets, and the warehouse club store, S&R. The city has also numerous hardware centers like Ace Hardware, Citi Hardware, and Wilcon Depot.

In terms of future developments, Robinsons Land Corp. expressed plans for their second mall in the city. The plan has since received backlash from groups that were against the decision to build it in the site of Nueva Ecija's Old Provincial Capitol.

Cabanatuan is also building a new main public market that is set to open on December 2023, after its old public market burnt down in April 2020.  In the meantime, a temporary public market is built in Melencio Street Ext., Brgy. Kapitan Pepe. It will soon be converted into the city's convention center. The government will also be building another temporary market in Brgy. San Isidro while the Magsaysay Market in Brgy. Sangitan is under renovation.

Hotels and Restaurants

The city has numerous accommodation and lodging establishments such as hotels, motels, inns, and resorts. In recent years, the local food scene in the city has experienced growth. Several restaurants, fast-food chains like Jollibee, McDonald's, and KFC, bars, coffee shops, and nightclubs are also located in the city. The local food scene offers a variety of culinary choices such as local delicacies, Japanese cuisine, and Korean cuisine. Food joints have also been established in Kapitan Pepe Subdivision, such as the Banatu Box Food Park, which is billed as one of the city's top food destinations.

Transportation

Public Transportation

Land 
Cabanatuan City is a major hub of land transportation services in Central Luzon. The city has many bus companies operating provincial and regional routes, with the Cabanatuan Central Transport Terminal serving as the terminus.

Much of the city's population rely on public transportation such as tricycles and jeeps to get around the city. The jeepney was patterned after U.S. Army jeeps and have been in use since the years immediately following World War II. Almost all types of public road transport plying Cabanatuan are privately owned and operated under government franchise.

Jeepney, van, and mini-bus operators serve routes within the province with some reaching as far to Dingalan, Baler, and Dilasag in Aurora, Olongapo City, San Fernando, and Dau in Pampanga, Mariveles and Balanga in Bataan, Baguio in Benguet, Dagupan, and Tarlac City. Tricycle operators serve local routes in the city and sometimes to nearby towns of Santa Rosa and Talavera.Intercity and interprovincial buses from Manila serve the city, and are usually operated by Baliwag Transit, Inc., Five Star, Victory Liner, Genesis Transport Service Inc., GV Florida Transport, ES Transport Inc., and Pangasinan Solid North.

Cabanatuan is accessible via the major expressway networks such as NLEX (from either Bulacan or Pampanga), SCTEX (from either Pampanga or Tarlac) and TPLEX (from Tarlac or Pangasinan). Then, the main access roads leading to Cabanatuan are the Pan-Philippine Highway, Santa Rosa –Tarlac Road, and the Nueva Ecija – Aurora Road.

Air 
The nearest airfield to Cabanatuan is the Fort Magsaysay Airfield, the largest military reservation of the Philippines located in the nearby town of Santa Rosa.

Road Network

National Highway 

Maharlika Highway (or Pan-Philippine Highway) is the main highway traversing Cabanatuan where most vehicles going to Cagayan Valley pass through. The city's portion of the Maharlika Highway starts from the city's southernmost barangay, Brgy. Sumacab Este, and ends at Brgy. Caalibangbangan.

Another highway that traverses Cabanatuan is the Nueva Ecija - Aurora Road. The highway links Cabanatuan to Baler, Aurora, passing through rural towns in eastern Nueva Ecija.

Arterial Roads 
Burgos Avenue and Del Pilar Street both serve as the city's main thoroughfare in the downtown area. Other major roads include the General Tinio and Rizal Streets that run through the city proper in an east–west direction; Mabini Street, where two of the city's three universities are situated, and the Circumferential Road that connects the downtown area to the Kapitan Pepe residential district.

Cabanatuan was previously served by the Manila Railroad Company in 1905 through the Balagtas – Cabanatuan line which was abandoned after the war because scavengers looted pieces of the rail tracks. Rail service was resumed in 1969 after the rehabilitation of the rail tracks as mandated by a government order. The service was again abandoned in the 1980s. The old Cabanatuan Railway Station is located at Barangay General Luna and is converted to a daycare center with the original structure remaining.

Expressways and Toll Roads 
Cabanatuan shall also be serviced by future expressways once completed. These are the North Luzon East Expressway (Quezon City to Cabanatuan), and the partially completed Central Luzon Link Expressway (SCTEX-TPLEX to San Jose City). Both expressways will shorten the usual travel time between the neighboring provinces and Cabanatuan City, also stimulating the economy of the towns that the carriageway will pass through as a direct consequence. Central Luzon Link Expressway from Tarlac City to San Juan, Aliaga is set to open in 2023. It is still unknown when NLEE will be completed.

Bypass Roads 
 
During the early 2000s to decongest the Pan-Philippine Highway and to spur new developments outside the downtown area, two bypass roads were constructed in Cabanatuan: the 10.3-kilometer Felipe Vergara Highway provides a direct route to Cagayan Valley, and the 12.35-kilometer Emilio Vergara Highway which links Santa Rosa to Nueva Ecija - Aurora Road, avoiding traffic bottleneck along Pan-Philippine Highway. There are present efforts being made to extend the Emilio Vergara Highway to Talavera.

Two flyovers are currently being constructed to ease prevailing traffic congestions in the city.

 The 278-meter Nueva Ecija - Aurora Road - Emilio Vergara Highway Flyover will be an extension of the Emilio Vergara Highway towards the Leopoldo Vergara Bridge, and will end at the boundary of Cabanatuan at Talavera, near the partially-completed CLLEX.
 The 330-meter Emilio Vergara Highway - Lakewood Intersection Flyover aims to reduce the traffic bottleneck in the Lakewood Avenue - Emilio Vergara Highway intersection.

Another flyover will also be built from Jollibee Sumacab Este to Emilio Vergara Highway in the future to alleviate traffic conditions in the Maharlika Highway.

Cabanatuan is also building major dike roads that shall serve as access roads to far-flung barangays in the city, such as Barangay Samon and Barangay Caudillo.

City Traffic 
Infrastructure improvements by the administration are ongoing. A Unified Command Center (UCC) for the city's traffic light system is currently under construction at 25 major intersections. Separate tricycle lanes are also present within the perimeter of the Public Market. Road extension, and road widening of the Emilio Vergara Highway from two to six lanes is nearing its completion. The widening of all city and arterial roads from one- to two-lane highway to three-lane highway is also being considered.

Tourism

Historical sites found in the city include:
 Cabanatuan Railroad Station is found in Barangay General Luna. It was built in early 1927 as the terminus of the now-abandoned Balagtas-Cabanatuan line. The building has since been converted into a barangay civic center and day care center, with the original structure preserved.
 Camp Pangatian (Prisoner of War Memorial Shrine) (Now Cabanatuan American Memorial), began as a military training camp for twenty years until converted into a concentration camp for allied prisoners of war during the Japanese occupation. A popular tourist destination among war veterans by way of the WWII Veteran's Homecoming Program. Camp Pangatian's liberation of World War II American prisoners of war held by the Japanese forces in January 1945 was the most successful rescue operation ever executed by the American military aided by the Filipino guerillas who were fighting the invaders. That tactical operation was immortalized in the movie The Great Raid.
 Freedom Park is a two-hectare provincial park located in front of the Old Provincial Capitol of Nueva Ecija, civic spaces as well as various monuments and memorials can be found inside the park which includes a monument dedicated to General Antonio Luna who was assassinated in the nearby Cathedral of San Nicolas de Tolentino.
 Gen. Antonio Luna Statue and Marker in found in Plaza Lucero. This statue of Philippine hero General Antonio Luna astride a horse stands at the plaza in front of the cathedral on the exact spot where the brave general was assassinated in 1899 in the city that adopted him subsequently. In May 2022, alongside Plaza Lucero, the statue was renovated and re-opened to the public.
 Old Provincial Capitol of Nueva Ecija is located along Burgos Avenue. The old provincial capitol was designed by prominent American architect William E. Parsons who also designed government buildings in Manila, Cebu and Laguna during the American Colonial Period. The old edifice has since been renovated and expanded.
 Cabanatuan Eco Park is a future city project that will convert the Valle Cruz dumpsite into a ten-hectare eco park. Government centers, including the new Cabanatuan City Hall, are to be built within the area.

Festivals and celebrations celebrated in Cabanatuan include:
 Banatu Festival celebrates its founding anniversary as a chartered city. From its humble beginning in 2015, "Banatu Festival" aims to showcase the history, culture, talent, beauty and craftsmanship of Cabanatueños.
 Longganisa Festival one of the activities in "Banatu Festival" and is held in the vicinity of the public market along Paco Roman Street. Apart from the local meat traders and customers, tourists from nearby towns also join the celebration. Highlights of this festival are the cooking contests and the different preparations for longganisa (native sausage like "batutay", "longganisang bawang" and "longganisang matamis"), including spaghetti and “binagoongan”.

Government
Cabanatuan City's current seat of government, the city hall, is located at Barangay San Josef Sur. The local government structure is composed of one mayor, one vice mayor, and ten councilors. Each official is elected publicly to a 3-year term and can be re-elected up to 3 terms in succession. The day-to-day administration of the city is handled by the city administrator.

Education 

Cabanatuan is a regional educational hub. The city more than forty higher education institutions including four universities, a science high school, more than fifty public and private high schools, and more than a hundred public and private primary schools.

Some prominent schools, universities and colleges within the city include:

ABE International College
Acatech Aviation College
AMA Computer College
Asian College of Science and Technology
Asian Institute of Computer Studies (AICS)
Asian Institute of E-commerce (AIE) Cabanatuan
Araullo University Main Campus
Araullo University South Campus
Cabanatuan East Central School
Cabanatuan City Senior High School
Camp Tinio National High School
Cesar E. Vergara Memorial High School
College for Research & Technology
College of the Immaculate Conception
Datamex Institute of Computer Technology - Cabanatuan City
Dr. Gloria Lacson Foundation Colleges
Eduardo L. Joson Memorial College
First Asian International Systems College
Good Samaritan Colleges
Great Values Learning Center
Honorato C. Perez Sr. Memorial Science High School
La Fortuna College
Lazaro Francisco Integrated School
Little Merry Hearts Montessori Center
Maria Assumpta Seminary
Midway Maritime Foundation
M.V. Gallego Foundation Colleges
Nueva Ecija University of Science and Technology Sumacab Main Campus
Nueva Ecija University of Science and Technology General Tinio Street Campus
North Central Academy for Culinary Arts 
Our Lady of Fatima University
Philippine Statesman College
Provincial Manpower Training Center
St. Augustine Foundation College
St. Bernadette Montessori Academy
St. John Regis Health Care Institute Inc.
Skill Power Institute
Wesleyan University (Philippines)

Healthcare

Many hospitals and clinics can be found in the city, most are private and with modern facilities which made Cabanatuan City the center for medical operations and research in the province. Most residents of the province go to Cabanatuan for their check-ups and appointments in hospitals and clinics within the city.

There are three (3) notable public and six (5 fully constructed, 1 under construction) private hospitals in Cabanatuan City:

Notable personalities
 Paolo Ballesteros, Filipino actor, TV host and model. He is also a host of Eat Bulaga.
 Heber Bartolome, Filipino folk and folk rock singer, songwriter, composer, poet, guitarist, bandurria player, bluesman, and painter.
 Ruel S. Bayani, Filipino film and television director, writer, producer, who is best known for directing movies like One More Try, and No Other Woman and co-directing television shows like Budoy, Kokey, Mula Sa Puso.
 Kathryn Bernardo, Filipina actress, singer and dancer. She is best known for her role as Mara in the primetime Filipino drama, Mara Clara and her lead roles in The Hows of Us and Hello, Love, Goodbye, two of the highest-grossing Filipino films of all time.
 Vic Sotto, multi-awarded Filipino actor, television host, comedian. He was the former vocalist for the band VST & Company, played a lead role in the sitcom Iskul Bukol and is a pioneer host of Eat Bulaga.
 Manuel Chua, Filipino male model and actor.
 Samboy de Leon, Filipino professional basketball player for TNT KaTropa of the Philippine Basketball Association. 
 Nestor de Villa, Filipino actor frequently cast in musical films and often paired with on-screen partner Nida Blanca. His dancing talent led some people to call him the "Fred Astaire of the Philippines".
 Frederick Kriekenbeek, exorcist and priest in Cebu.
 John Paul Lizardo, Filipino taekwondo Asian Games bronze medalist, actor and commercial model.
 Bert Matias, Filipino actor, known for Book of Swords, Renegade Force and Fred Claus.
 Ameurfina Melencio-Herrera, Filipino lawyer and jurist who served as Associate Justice of the Supreme Court of the Philippines from 1979 to 1992. Herrera is a granddaughter of Emilio Aguinaldo.
 Kurt Perez, former child actor
 Willie Revillame, television host, actor, comedian, recording artist and businessman. He was the host for the variety show Wowowee at ABS-CBN and currently hosts Wowowin at GMA Network.
 Yen Santos, Filipina actress and dancer. A part of ABS-CBN's Star Magic, she has appeared in Growing Up, Pure Love and Dream Dad.

Sister cities
Cabanatuan has the following sister cities:

References

External links

 [ Philippine Standard Geographic Code]

 
Cities in Nueva Ecija
Populated places established in 1780
1780 establishments in the Philippines
Populated places on the Pampanga River
Former national capitals
Former provincial capitals of the Philippines
Component cities in the Philippines